James David Hart,  (April 18, 1911 – 23 July 1990) was an American literary scholar and professor at University of California, Berkeley for fifty-four years. He is most notable for writing The Oxford Companion to American Literature and A Companion to California.

Biography
Hart was born in San Francisco, California. He received a bachelor's degree from Stanford University, followed by a Ph.D. from Harvard University.

While studying for his doctorate at Harvard University, Hart conceived and began work on an American literature companion book. It is reported that in 1934, after looking for such a book among second-hand bookstores on what was Fourth Avenue below 14th Street in Manhattan, New York to no avail, Hart entered the offices of Oxford University Press on Fifth Avenue upon passing. Inside, on a whim, he told the receptionist that he had an idea for a book, which prompted editor Margaret Nicholson to come out to meet him. He questioned her about the existence of such a book, to which she replied, "We've been looking for someone to do that." She took him in to see director of the press Geoffrey Cumberlege. Cumberlege wanted to see examples of his work, and Hart had none. Furthermore, Cumberledge was sailing to Europe on the  the next day, so Hart returned to his hotel room and produced essays on Ralph Waldo Emerson and Richard Henry Dana amongst others, and delivered them to Cumberledge the next morning. A few months later he was granted a contract, and wrote the book alone. Critic Alfred Kazin said it is "the most valuable handbook I know on our literature," and had been on his desk for nearly half a century.

At the University of California, Berkeley, Hart served as chairman of the English department. He was also the university's vice chancellor from 1957 until 1960. In 1969 he was appointed director of the University of California, Berkeley's Bancroft Library. He was a fellow of the American Academy of Arts and Sciences and of the American Antiquarian Society. He was a trustee of Mills College from 1970 until 1986, and was president of the board for three years. In 1963 he was appointed a CBE.

Hart died in his home in Berkeley, California on July 23, 1990, at the age of seventy-nine. His family reported that he had died of a brain tumor.

Hart has had articles published in American Heritage, American Literature and American Quarterly, as well as other general and scholarly journals. He also has published works on Robert Louis Stevenson, Frank Norris, Western history, popular writing and fine printing.

The 1981 reissue of Moby Dick by Herman Melville published by the University of California Press features an essay by Hart entitled A Note on the California Edition, where at the time he is credited as Director of The Bancroft Library.

Family
He was married to Ruth Arnstein, a California native, born December 2, 1917. She died in Berkeley on December 4, 1977, Later, he married Constance Crowley Bowles. His daughter, the writer Carol Field, died of a stroke on March 10, 2017 at her home in San Francisco; his son, the pollster Peter Hart, lives in Washington D.C.. As of July 24, 1990, he has four grandchildren.

Bibliography
 The Oxford Companion to American Literature
 The Concise Oxford Companion to American Literature. 1986
 A Companion to California, Oxford University Press, 1978. revised edition, UC Press, 1991
 The Popular Book: A History of America's Literary Taste (1950)
 From Scotland to Silverado by Robert Louis Stevenson (editor)
 Influences on California Printing (and Ritchie Ward)
 Fine Printing: The San Francisco Tradition
 Lawton Kennedy, Printer by Ruth Teiser (foreword)
 America's Literature (and Clarence Louis Frank Gohdes)

Further reading
 Bliss, Anthony. The Legacy of James D. Hart at the Bancroft Library 1970-1990. Friends of the Bancroft Library, 1991.

References

External links
Guide to the James D. Hart Papers at The Bancroft Library
 James David Hart at Library Thing
 James D. Hart at Borders (UK)

1911 births
1990 deaths
Commanders of the Order of the British Empire
Stanford University alumni
Harvard University alumni
University of California, Berkeley College of Letters and Science faculty